Lunas (Tamil: லுனாஸ், Chinese: 魯乃 ) is a sub-district of Kulim District which lies in Kedah, Malaysia. Lunas also serves as a state constituency in the Parliament Constituency of Padang Serai, Kedah. The town is famous for Roast Duck rice. The majority of people here are ethnic Chinese and Indian. Meanwhile, total population stand at 18,236

Development history
The town was founded in the early 20th century, while its shophouses were constructed between 1910s and 1930s, when Kedah was under British protection at that time. During that period many local people including Chinese and Indian migrant worked at rubber estates that were formerly owned by British companies. One of the earliest schools was Lunas English School.

Today, there are still many well-preserved gems such as pre-war shophouses, a traditional "wooden bungalow on stilts" post office, and the colonial-style Soon Cheng Sai mansion.

Attractions

Temples
 Lunas Buddhist Hermitage
 Hock Teik Soo Temple 
 Sri Maha Kuttakarai Muniswarar Alayam Temple.
 Sri Maha Muthu Mariaman (Ladang Wellesley Temple)

Historic Building
 Lunas Smoke House
 Soon Mansion

See also
 Butterworth–Kulim Expressway
 Northern Corridor Economic Region
 Kedah
 Kulim
 Penang

References

Kulim District
Towns in Kedah